Za'atar is a culinary herb or family of herbs. It is also the name of a spice mixture that includes the herb along with toasted sesame seeds, dried sumac, often salt, as well as other spices. As a family of related Middle Eastern herbs, it contains plants from the genera Origanum (oregano), Calamintha (basil thyme), Thymus (typically Thymus vulgaris, i.e., thyme), and Satureja (savory) plants. The name za'atar alone most properly applies to Origanum syriacum, considered in biblical scholarship to be the ezov of the Hebrew Bible, often translated as hyssop but distinct from modern Hyssopus officinalis. 

Used in Levantine cuisine, both the herb and spice mixture are popular throughout the Mediterranean region of the Middle East.

Etymology

 
According to Ignace J. Gelb, an Akkadian language word that can be read sarsar may refer to a spice plant. This word could be attested in the Syriac satre, and Arabic za'atar (or sa'tar), possibly the source of Latin Satureia. Satureia (Satureja) is a common name for Satureja thymbra, a species of savory whose other common and ethnic names include, "Persian za'atar", "za'atar rumi" (Roman hyssop), and "za'atar franji" (European hyssop). In the Modern Hebrew language, za'atar is used as an Arabic loanword.

Thymus capitatus (also called Satureja capitata) is a species of wild thyme found throughout the hills of the Levant and Mediterranean Middle East. Thyme is said to be a plant "powerfully associated with Palestine", and the spice mixture za'atar is common fare there. Thymbra spicata, a plant native to Greece and to Palestine/Israel and has been cultivated in North America by Syrian, Palestinian, and Lebanese immigrants for use in their za'atar preparations since the 1940s.

Another species identified as "wild za'atar" (Arabic: za'atar barri) is Origanum vulgare, commonly known as European oregano, oregano, pot marjoram, wild marjoram, winter marjoram, or wintersweet. This species is also extremely common in Lebanon, Syria, Jordan, Israel, and Palestine, and is used by peoples of the region to make one local variety of the spice mixture.

Other Latin names for the herbs called za'atar in Arabic include Origanum syriacum (also known as Bible hyssop, Arabic oregano and wild marjoram) and Origanum majorana (sweet marjoram). Both oregano and marjoram are closely related Mediterranean plants of the family Lamiaceae, so it is unsurprising that they could be used interchangeably.

Preparation as a condiment, and variations
 
Za'atar as a prepared condiment is traditionally made with ground origanum syriacum mixed with roasted sesame seeds, and salt, though other spices such as sumac berries might also be added. In areas where origanum syriacum is not readily available, thyme, oregano, marjoram, or some combination thereof is used instead, and some commercial varieties also include roasted wheat. Traditionally, housewives throughout the Fertile Crescent, Iraq, and the Arabian Peninsula made their own variations of za'atar. This general practice is cited by Western observers of Middle Eastern and North African culinary cultures as one reason for their difficulties in determining the names of the different spices used. Written history lacks an early definitive reference to za'atar as a spice mixture, though unidentified terms in the Yale Babylonian Collection may be references to spice blends.

Some varieties may add savory, cumin, coriander or fennel seed. One distinctively Palestinian variation of za'atar includes caraway seeds, while a Lebanese variety contains more sumac and has a distinct dark red color. Like baharat (a typically Egyptian spice mix of ground cinnamon, cloves, and allspice or rosebuds) and other spice mixtures popular in the Arab world, za'atar is high in anti-oxidants.

Za'atar, both the herb and the condiment, is popular in Algeria, Armenia, Egypt, Iraq, Israel, Kuwait, Jordan, Lebanon, Libya, Morocco, Palestine, Saudi Arabia, Syria, Tunisia, and Turkey.

History

There is evidence that a za'atar plant was known and used in Ancient Egypt, though its ancient name has yet to be determined with certainty. Remains of Thymbra spicata, one species used in modern za'atar preparations, were found in the tomb of Tutankhamun, and according to Dioscorides, this particular species was known to the Ancient Egyptians as saem.

Pliny the Elder mentions a herb maron as an ingredient of the Regale Unguentum ("Royal Perfume") used by the Parthian kings in the 1st century CE.

In Jewish tradition, Saadiah (d. 942), Ibn Ezra (d. circa 1164), Maimonides (1135–1204) and Obadiah ben Abraham (1465–1515) identified the ezov mentioned in the Hebrew Bible (Hebrew: אזוב, Samaritan Hebrew: ࠀࠉࠆࠅࠁ) with the Arabic word "za'atar". Ezov/za'atar is particularly associated with ritual purity ceremonies, such as preparing the ashes of the red heifer (Numbers 19:6) and handling bodily contaminations (Leviticus 14:4, 6, 51–52; Numbers 20:18). The Children of Israel are also said to have used a clump of ezov/za'atar stalks to daub the blood of the Paschal sacrifice on the doorposts of their houses before leaving bondage in Egypt (Exodus 12:22). King David refers to the purifying powers of the herb in Psalm 51:7, "Cleanse me with ezov/za'atar and I shall be purified." Much later, ezov/za'atar appears in the 2nd century CE Mishnah as an ingredient in food at that time in Judea ('Uktzin 2:2), while elsewhere in the Talmud there is mention of herbs ground into oil (a preparation called mish'cha t'china in Aramaic, משחא טחינא), but it is not specified whether this was like the za'atar mix known today. In the 12th century Maimonides described the use of the za'atar (צעתר, صعتر) he identified in contemporary cuisine, noting that "the ezov mentioned in the Torah is the ezov that the homeowners eat and season their stews with it." (Mishneh Torah, Parah Adumah 3:2)

Along with other spiced salts, za'atar has been used as a staple in Arab cuisine from medieval times to the present.

For Palestinians, za'atar has historical significance; some consider its presence to be a sign of a Palestinian home. For Palestinian refugees, plants and foods such as za'atar also serve as signifiers of the house, village, and region from which they hailed.

Once used mainly by Arab bakeries, za'atar is now a common herb in Israeli cuisine. Some Israeli companies market za'atar commercially as "hyssop" or "holy hyssop". Hyssopus officinalis is not found in the wild in Israel, but Origanum vulgare is extremely common.

Ecologists found that wild za'atar was on the verge of extinction in Israel due to over-harvesting. In 1977, an Israeli law was passed declaring it a protected species. Violators are subject to fines. Some Arab citizens of Israel (who traditionally picked the wild herbs) have described the legislation as "almost anti-Arab". The ban on picking wild za'atar is also enforced in the West Bank. In 2006, za'atar plants were confiscated at IDF checkpoints.

Culinary use

Za'atar is traditionally dried in the sun and mixed with salt, sesame seeds and sumac. It is commonly eaten with pita, which is dipped in olive oil and then za'atar. When the dried herb is moistened with olive oil, the spread is known as za'atar-wu-zayt or zeit ou za'atar (zeit or zayt, meaning "oil" in Arabic and "olive" in Hebrew). This mixture spread on a dough base and baked as a bread, produces  manakeesh bi zaatar. In the Mediterranean region of Middle East, ka'ak (a soft sesame seed bread), is sold in bakeries and by street vendors with za'atar to dip into or with a za'atar filling.

Za'atar is used as a seasoning for meats and vegetables or sprinkled onto  hummus. It is also eaten with labneh (yogurt drained to make a tangy, creamy cheese), and bread and olive oil for breakfast, most commonly in Jordan, Palestine, Israel, Syria, and Lebanon, as well as other places in the Arab world. The Lebanese speciality shanklish, dry-cured balls of labneh, can be rolled in za'atar to form its outer coating.

The fresh za'atar herb is used in a number of dishes. Borek is a common bread pastry that can be stuffed with various ingredients, including za'atar. A salad made of fresh za'atar leaves (Arabic: salatet al-zaatar al-akhdar) is also popular throughout the Levant. The recipe is simple, consisting of fresh thyme, finely chopped onions, garlic, lemon juice, olive oil and salt.

A traditional beverage in Oman is za'atar steeped in boiling water to make a herbal tea.

Folk medicine

In Palestine, there is a folk belief that za'atar makes the mind alert, and children are sometimes encouraged to eat za'atar at breakfast before school.

Maimonides (Rambam), a medieval rabbi and physician who lived in Spain, Morocco, and Egypt, prescribed za'atar for its health advancing properties in the 12th century. Since ancient times, people in the Mediterranean region of Middle East have thought za'atar could be used to reduce and eliminate internal parasites.

Notes

References

Bibliography

External links
 

Herb and spice mixtures
Arab cuisine
Israeli cuisine
Jordanian cuisine
Lebanese cuisine
Levantine cuisine
Palestinian cuisine
Syrian cuisine
Turkish cuisine
Condiments